Louisa is a 1950 American comedy film directed by Alexander Hall and starring Ronald Reagan, Charles Coburn, Ruth Hussey, Edmund Gwenn and Spring Byington. It was produced and distributed by Universal Pictures. It was nominated for the Academy Award for Best Sound (Leslie I. Carey).

Plot
Grandma Louisa begins dating grocer Henry Hammond, much to the disgust of her son Hal and the rest of the family. Hal's boss Mr. Burnside becomes Hammond's rival for Louisa's affections.

Cast
 Ronald Reagan as Hal Norton
 Charles Coburn as Mr. Burnside
 Ruth Hussey as Meg Norton
 Edmund Gwenn as Mr. Hammond
 Spring Byington as Louisa Norton
 Piper Laurie as Cathy Norton
 Scotty Beckett as Jimmy Blake
 Jimmy Hunt as Chris Norton
 Connie Gilchrist as Gladys
 Willard Waterman as Dick Stewart
 Marjorie Crossland as Lil Stewart
 Martin Milner as Bob Stewart
 Terry Frost as Stacy Walker
 Dave Willock as Joe Collins

References

External links

1950 films
1950 comedy films
Universal Pictures films
American black-and-white films
American comedy films
Films directed by Alexander Hall
Films scored by Frank Skinner
1950s English-language films
1950s American films